Villaflores Municipality is a municipio (municipality) in the state of Chiapas, southern Mexico, and the name of its largest settlement and seat of the municipal government. Situated in the Sierra Madre de Chiapas range, the municipality has an area of approximately 1232 km2 at an average elevation of 540m above mean sea level. 

As of 2010, the municipality had a total population of 98,618.

As of 2010, the city of Villaflores had a population of 37,237. Other than the city of Villaflores, the municipality had 1,588 localities, the largest of which (with 2010 populations in parentheses) were: Jesús María Garza (6,724), Cristóbal Obregón (4,664), Guadalupe Victoria (Lázaro Cárdenas) (3,583), Benito Juárez (3,567), Cuauhtémoc (3,084), Nuevo México (3,014), Doctor Domingo Chanona (2,962), Villa Hidalgo (2,502), classified as urban, and Roblada Grande (1,729), Joaquín Miguel Gutiérrez (1,663), Francisco Villa (1,360), Libertad Melchor Ocampo (1,324), Agrónomos Mexicanos (1,202), Dieciséis de Septiembre (1,177), Ignacio Zaragoza (1,055), and Calzada Larga (1,049), classified as rural.

Notes

References

External links
 H.Ayuntamiento de Villaflores, official website of the municipal authority 

Municipalities of Chiapas
Sierra Madre de Chiapas